The Vision is a monthly magazine published by the spiritual center Anandashram, in Kanhangad, India.

History and profile
The Vision was founded by Swami Ramdas in 1933. The first issue appeared in October 1933. The magazine is circulated monthly. It publishes his teachings, as well as those of his center co-founders Mother Krishnabai, Swami Satchidananda, and other Indian spiritual teachers.

References

External links
Vision website

1933 establishments in India
English-language magazines published in India
Monthly magazines published in India
Magazines about spirituality
Magazines established in 1933